Nairobi Northern Bypass Highway, is a road in Kenya, the largest economy in the East African Community. It connects the neighborhood of Ruaka to the neighborhood of Ruiru, both in Kiambu County.

Location
From there, the road travels in a general easterly direction through Runda. It briefly crosses into Kiambu County, passes above Kiambu Road, re-enters Nairobi County and continues to a neighborhood called Marurui in Roysambu Constituency. At Marurui, the road takes a north-easterly direction, crosses Kamiti Road, then passes through Kahawa West and the Kenyatta University Hospital and re-enters Kiambu County at the Kamiti River bridge near Membley Estate and Kiwanja neighborhoods. It ends at the intersection with the Nairobi Eastern Bypass Highway in Ruiru OJ neighborhood.

Overview
This road is one of the four bypass highways built to direct motorized traffic away from the central business district of the city of Nairobi, to alleviate the perennial traffic jams on the city streets. The bypass highways include (a) Nairobi Western Bypass Highway (b) Nairobi Eastern Bypass Highway (c) Nairobi Southern Bypass Highway and (d) Nairobi Northern Bypass Highway. It is one of these four bypass roads that form a  ring-road around the city.

Construction
The highway was constructed between 2009, and 2014, as a two-lane, single carriageway road. The work was performed by China Road and Bridge Corporation. Work on this road together with the  Nairobi Eastern Bypass Highway, was budgeted at KSh8.5 billion (US$85 million). The funding for both these roads was as illustrated in the table below.

Expansion
In 2018, the Kenyan government contracted Sinohydro Limited to convert the Nairobi Northern Bypass Highway to a four-lane dual carriageway with culverts, drainage channels and walkways on both sides. It is estimated that dualling the Northern and Eastern Bypass Highways will cost anywhere from KSh30 billion to KSh40 billion (US$300 million to US$400 million). The process is on-going, as of March 2019.

See also
 List of roads in Kenya
 List of bypass highways in Nairobi

References

External links
 Why you will soon be paying on the spot to use major roads As of 16 June 2018.

Roads in Kenya
Transport in Kenya
Kiambu County
Nairobi
Transport infrastructure in Africa
2014 establishments in Kenya